Chrisna van Zyl (née Bootha; born 10 August 1983) is a South African netball player. Van Zyl plays in the positions of Goal Shooter (GS) and Goal Attack (GA). She is a member of the South Africa national netball team and has competed in the 2010 Commonwealth Games in Delhi and the 2011 World Netball Championships in Singapore, among many other tournaments. She has also participated in the 2010 World Netball Series and the 2011 World Netball Series, both held in Liverpool, UK. In October 2012, she travelled with the Proteas to Australia & New Zealand to participate in the Quad-Series tournament.

In November 2012 she was a member of the Proteas Fast5 team in the 2012 Fast5 Netball World Series where she won a bronze medal. She scored several long range "Super Shots" throughout the tournament, a major reason for the Proteas success.

Playing history

References

External links
 Netball South Africa official player profile. Retrieved on 2011-11-29.
 Chrisna Bootha player profile, Netball England website. Retrieved on 2011-11-29.

South African netball players
Commonwealth Games competitors for South Africa
Netball players at the 2010 Commonwealth Games
1983 births
Living people